Anatoli Viktorovich Pulyayev (born 27 March 1988) is a Russian former professional footballer.

Club career
On 7 June 2019, Russian Football Union banned him from football activity for three years after he allegedly accepted a bribe for ensuring that his team FC Chernomorets Novorossiysk loses to FC Chayka Peschanokopskoye.

References

References
 

1988 births
People from Novorossiysk
Living people
Russian footballers
Association football defenders
FC Chernomorets Novorossiysk players
FC Spartak-UGP Anapa players
Sportspeople from Krasnodar Krai